White Store Township, population 506, is one of eight townships in Anson County, North Carolina,  United States. White Store Township does not contain any municipalities.

Geography
The northwestern end of White Store Township is drained by Brown Creek and its tributary, Black Jack Branch.  The southeastern end is drained by Deadfall Creek and its tributaries, Shaw Creek, Bell Creek, and Boles Creek.  The extreme southeastern corner is drained by Thompson Creek.  Savannah Branch drains a small part of the southern part of the township.

References

Townships in Anson County, North Carolina
Townships in North Carolina